Mistaria kiwuensis is a species of spider in the family Agelenidae, which contains at least 1,350 species . It was first described by Strand in 1913 as the subspecies Agelena jumbo kiwuensis. Agelena jumbo was moved to the genus Mistaria in 2019, so that the subspecies became Mistaria jumbo kiwuensis. It was then elevated to the full species Mistaria kiwuensis later in the same year. It is native to the Democratic Republic of the Congo.

References

Agelenidae
Spiders of Africa
Spiders described in 1913
Endemic fauna of the Democratic Republic of the Congo